Sulur Air Force Station is an air base of the Indian Air Force located  at Sulur near Coimbatore, Tamil Nadu and is India's second largest air base after Hindon AFS. It is the base which is responsible for protection of India's sea area. It is the only base in India which handles both fighter and transport flights at one location; no other base in India is equipped to do so. It is also the  only IAF base in India to have all Departments at one location: fighters, carrier planes, carrier helicopters, attack helicopters, a repair and overhauling depot, TETTRA school, Garud Force, Air Force Hospital, Southern Command Sub Headquarters, & ECHS. It is a former Royal Navy and Indian Navy base.

History
The base was established in 1940 by the Royal Navy of the then British Raj. The base was called HMS Vairi and hosted a Fleet Air Arm Royal Navy Air Yard (RNAY) known as RNAY Sulur, a repair base for aircraft operating in Southeast Asia during World War II. The base was burned down on 26 August 1942 during the 1942 August revolution. In 1943, the Indian Royal Air Force came to Sulur, which later transferred to Cochin in 1949.

After gaining independence, the Indian Navy established INS Hansa to operate Hawker Sea Hawks. After the liberation of Goa, INA Hansa was shifted to Goa's Dabolim airfield and Sulur was taken over by the air force. In 1955, the 5BRD (No 5, Base Repair Depot) of the Indian Air Force was planned and it started functioning in 1959. The airbase was also used for civil aviation and for racing motorcycles and cars in the 1960s.

Since 14 January 1984 this base has been completely operated and maintained by the Indian Air Force.

Operational aircraft  
The base is home for 5 Base Repair Depot and 43 Wing of the Indian Air Force. The 33 squadron "Himalayan Geese" which operated Antonov An-32 medium transport aircraft is based at Sulur. The base also accommodates 109 helicopter unit "Knights" operating Mi-17 V5 transport helicopters. The Sarang helicopter display team belonging to 151 Squadron of the Indian Air Force has its primary garrison at Sulur and operates modified HAL Dhruv helicopters. Starting from July 2018, the air force station is also home of the 45 Squadron "Flying Daggers", which operates HAL Tejas. On May 27, 2020, 18 Squadron "Flying Bullets" was operationalised from this air base. 610 Garud Flight was formed at 43 Wing Sulur on 22 Nov 2010. The flight specialises in counter insurgency and counter terrorist operations

References

External links 

Indian Air Force bases
Airports in Tamil Nadu
1940 establishments in British India
Military installations established in 1940
20th-century architecture in India